Sir John Norton, 3rd Baronet (1620 – 9 January 1687) was an English  politician who sat in the House of Commons between 1661 and 1687. He supported the Royalist cause in the English Civil War.

Norton was the son of Sir Richard Norton, 1st Baronet and his wife Amy Bilson, daughter of Thomas Bilson, Bishop of Winchester. He matriculated at Corpus Christi College, Oxford on 23 June 1637, aged 17. He was admitted to Middle Temple in 1641. During the CIvil War, he and his father supported the King and suffered accordingly.  He succeeded to the baronetcy on the death of his brother in 1652.

In 1661, Norton was elected Member of Parliament for Hampshire in the Cavalier Parliament. He was elected MP for  Petersfield in 1679 and sat until his death.
 
Norton died at the age of 67 and was buried at East Tisted, when the Baronetcy became extinct.

Norton married Dorothy March, daughter of Thomas March of Ely before September 1670.

References

1620 births
1687 deaths
Alumni of Corpus Christi College, Oxford
Members of the Middle Temple
Baronets in the Baronetage of England
English MPs 1661–1679
English MPs 1679
English MPs 1680–1681
English MPs 1681
English MPs 1685–1687
Cavaliers
Place of birth missing